Orange is an open-source data visualization, machine learning and data mining toolkit. It features a visual programming front-end for explorative qualitative data analysis and interactive data visualization.

Description 

Orange is a component-based visual programming software package for data visualization, machine learning, data mining, and data analysis.

Orange components are called widgets. They range from simple data visualization, subset selection, and preprocessing to empirical evaluation of learning algorithms
and predictive modeling.

Visual programming is implemented through an interface in which workflows are created by linking predefined or user-designed widgets, while advanced users can use Orange as a Python library for data manipulation and widget alteration.

Software 

Orange is an open-source software package released under GPL and hosted on GitHub. Versions up to 3.0 include core components in C++ with wrappers in Python. From version 3.0 onwards, Orange uses common Python open-source libraries for scientific computing, such as numpy, scipy and scikit-learn, while its graphical user interface operates within the cross-platform Qt framework.

The default installation includes a number of machine learning, preprocessing and data visualization algorithms in 6 widget sets (data, transform, visualize, model, evaluate and unsupervised). Additional functionalities are available as add-ons (text-mining, image analytics, bioinformatics, etc.).

Orange is supported on macOS, Windows and Linux and can also be installed from the Python Package Index repository (pip install Orange3).

Features 

Orange consists of a canvas interface onto which the user places widgets and creates a data analysis workflow. Widgets offer basic functionalities such as reading the data, showing a data table, selecting features, training predictors, comparing learning algorithms, visualizing data elements, etc. The user can interactively explore visualizations or feed the selected subset into other widgets.

Canvas: graphical front-end for data analysis
Widgets:
Data: widgets for data input, data filtering, sampling, imputation, feature manipulation and feature selection
Visualize: widgets for common visualization (box plot, histograms, scatter plot) and multivariate visualization (mosaic display, sieve diagram).
Classify: a set of supervised machine learning algorithms for classification
Regression: a set of supervised machine learning algorithms for regression
Evaluate: cross-validation, sampling-based procedures, reliability estimation and scoring of prediction methods
Unsupervised: unsupervised learning algorithms for clustering (k-means, hierarchical clustering) and data projection techniques (multidimensional scaling, principal component analysis, correspondence analysis).

Add-ons 

Orange users can extend their core set of components with components in the add-ons. Supported add-ons include:

 Associate: components for mining frequent itemsets and association rule learning. 
 Bioinformatics: components for gene expression analysis, enrichment, and access to expression databases (e.g., Gene Expression Omnibus) and pathway libraries.
 Data fusion: components for fusing different data sets, collective matrix factorization, and exploration of latent factors.
 Educational: components for teaching machine learning concepts, such as k-means clustering, polynomial regression, stochastic gradient descent, ...
Explain: provides an extension with components for the model explanation, including Shapley value analysis
 Geo: components for working with geospatial data.
 Image analytics: components for working with images and ImageNet embeddings
 Network: components for graph and network analysis.
 Text mining: components for natural language processing and text mining.
 Time series: widget components for time series analysis and modeling.
Single-cell: support for single-cell gene expression analysis, including components for loading single-cell data, filtering and batch effect removal, marker genes discovery, scoring of cells and genes, and cell type prediction.
 Spectroscopy: components for analyzing and visualization of (hyper)spectral datasets. 
Survival analysis: add-on for data analysis dealing with survival data. It includes widgets for standard survival analysis techniques, such as the Kaplan-Meier plot, the Cox regression model, and several derivative widgets.
World Happiness: support for downloading socioeconomic data from a database, including OECD and World Development Indicators. Provides access to thousands of country indicators from various economic databases.

Objectives 

The program provides a platform for experiment selection, recommendation systems, and predictive modelling and is used in biomedicine, bioinformatics, genomic research, and teaching. In science, it is used as a platform for testing new machine learning algorithms and for implementing new techniques in genetics and bioinformatics. In education, it was used for teaching machine learning and data mining methods to students of biology, biomedicine, and informatics.

Extensions 
Various projects build on Orange either by extending the core components with add-ons or using only the Orange Canvas to exploit the implemented visual programming features and GUI.

 OASYS — ORange SYnchrotron Suite 
 scOrange — single cell biostatistics
 Quasar — data analysis in natural sciences

History 
 In 1996, the University of Ljubljana and Jožef Stefan Institute started development of ML*, a machine learning framework in C++.
 In 1997, Python bindings were developed for ML*, which, together with emerging Python modules, formed a joint framework called Orange.
 During the following years, most major algorithms for data mining and machine learning have been developed in C++ (Orange's core) or Python modules.
 In 2002, first prototypes to create a flexible graphical user interface were designed using Pmw Python megawidgets.
 In 2003, the graphical user interface was redesigned and re-developed for Qt framework using PyQt Python bindings. The visual programming framework was defined, and the development of widgets (graphical components of the data analysis pipeline) began.
 In 2005, extensions for data analysis in bioinformatics was created.
 In 2008, Mac OS X DMG and Fink-based installation packages were developed.
 In 2009, over 100 widgets were created and maintained.
 Since 2009, Orange is in 2.0 beta, and web site offers installation packages based on the daily compiling cycle.
 In 2012, a new object hierarchy was imposed, replacing the old module-based structure.
 In 2013, a significant redesign of the graphical user interface included a new toolbox and depiction of workflows.
 In 2015, Orange 3.0 was released. Orange stores the data in the NumPy arrays; machine learning algorithms mostly use scikit-learn.
 In 2015, a text analysis add-on for Orange3 was released.
 In 2016, Orange is in version 3.3. The development uses a monthly stable release cycle.
 In 2016, Start of development and release of Image Analytics add-on, with server-site deep neural networks for image embedding 
 In 2017, Spectroscopy add-on for the analysis of spectral data was introduced.  
 In 2017,  Geo, an add-on for dealing with geo-location data and visualisation of geo maps was introduced 
 In 2018, the development and release of add-on for single-cell data analysis was started.  
In 2019, Orange's graphical interface is developed as a separate project, orange-canvas-core 
In 2020, Explain add-on with widgets for explaining classification or regression model is introduced. It explains which features contribute the most and how they contribute towards predicting a specific class. 
In 2022 World Happiness, an add-on for the Orange3 data mining suite, is introduced. It provides widgets for accessing socioeconomic data from various databases such as World Happiness Report, World Development Indicators, OECD.
 In 2022, Explain add-on is extended with an Individual Conditional Expectation plot and the Permutation Feature Importance technique.

References

Further reading 
 Demšar, Janez and Blaž Zupan, Data Mining Fruitful and Fun - A Historical Perspective, Informatica 37, pgs. 55–60, (2013).

External links 
 
 OASYS
 scOrange
 Quasar

Applications of artificial intelligence
Cross-platform free software
Data mining and machine learning software
Data visualization software
Free plotting software
Free science software
Free software programmed in Python
Numerical software
Science software that uses Qt
Software using the GPL license
Time series software